Harry Wayne Huizenga Sr. (December 29, 1937 – March 22, 2018) was an American businessman, entrepreneur, and philanthropist. He founded AutoNation and Waste Management Inc., and was the owner or co-owner of Blockbuster Video, the Miami Dolphins of the National Football League (NFL), the Florida Panthers of the National Hockey League (NHL), and the Florida Marlins (now Miami Marlins) of Major League Baseball (MLB).

Background
Harry Wayne Huizenga was of Dutch descent. His grandfather, Harm Huizenga, came to the United States from the Netherlands. Starting with a horse and wagon, Harm Huizenga built trash hauling service, Huizenga & Sons Scavenger Co. in suburban Chicago in 1894. Wayne Huizenga's parents, Gerrit Harry Huizenga (1916–2001), a cabinet maker, and Jean Huizenga (née Riddering; 1918–2006), a home decorator; grew up in the Dutch community in Chicago and were strict Dutch Reformed Christians.

Huizenga was born at Little Company of Mary Hospital, in Evergreen Park, Illinois, on December 29, 1937, the first child in a family of garbage haulers. In 1940 when Wayne was 2, the Huizenga family were listed as living in an apartment building in Berwyn, Illinois. He had one sister, Bonnie, who was five years younger. He attended Chicago Christian High School in his sophomore year. In 1953, the Huizenga family moved to Florida and settled in the Fort Lauderdale area. His father became a building contractor in a booming real estate market.

The remainder of Huizenga's high school years were spent at Pine Crest School, where he was a member of the football team and senior class treasurer. After high school graduation in 1956, he moved back to Chicago where most of his friends, grandparents and other relatives still lived, and enrolled for three semesters at Calvin College, a liberal arts college in Grand Rapids, Michigan, but he dropped out before the end of his sophomore year. For approximately five years after graduation, he was taking on low-wage jobs and enrolled briefly for six months in September 1959 in the army reserves on full-time service.

Career
In Fort Lauderdale, Huizenga started a garbage hauling business, as his grandfather had done in Chicago in 1894. In 1962, he started the Southern Sanitation Service by borrowing US$5,000 from his father and convincing a rival trash hauler to sell him used trucks. Beginning with a single garbage truck in 1968, and pursuing customers in an aggressive manner, he created Waste Management, Inc., an entity that would eventually become a Fortune 500 company. Huizenga purchased many independent garbage hauling companies; by the time he took the company public in 1972, he had completed the acquisition of 133 small-time haulers. In the early 1980s, he had grown Waste Management into one of the largest waste-disposal companies in the United States. In 1984, he left the company and soon again, he was buying companies including suppliers of portable toilets and water bottles for home coolers.

Huizenga repeated the process with Blockbuster Video, acquiring a handful of stores in 1987, with the company becoming the leading movie-rental chain in the U.S. by 1994. After a process of building and acquiring auto dealerships, in 1996, he formed AutoNation, which became the nation's largest automotive dealer.

In 2004, he sold Boca Resorts, a group of hotels that included The Hyatt Pier 66 Hotel and the Radisson Bahia Mar Hotel & Marina in Fort Lauderdale, The Boca Raton Resort & Club in Boca Raton, Florida, and several others in Naples, Florida and Arizona to private equity firm Blackstone as part of a $1.25 billion deal.

In 2010, Huizenga along with Steve Berrard, former CEO of Blockbuster Video and AutoNation, took on a majority stake in Swisher Hygiene, after paying $8.1 million to founder Patrick Swisher and his wife, Laura. Swisher Hygiene went on to be traded on the NASDAQ and the Toronto Stock Exchange via a 2010 reverse takeover deal in which the company acquired the publicly traded CoolBrands International, a Canada-based frozen food and dessert manufacturer. CoolBrands had divested its core businesses in 2007, leaving little more than a corporate shell.

Sports team ownership
Huizenga was notable for introducing both baseball and ice hockey to the South Florida area as the creator and initial owner of the Florida Marlins and Florida Panthers. Also, he bought the cable television channel SportsChannel Florida (now Bally Sports Florida) in 1996 to air his teams' games in the region.

He was criticized for naming the two teams for the state of Florida rather than the city of Miami. As an advocate for the city of Fort Lauderdale, he explained that his goal was to include Broward County and Palm Beach County in his teams' fan base.

In 1994, Huizenga's brother-in-law attempted to purchase the NBA's Miami Heat, but was unsuccessful.

American football
In 1990, during a period of financial hardship for the franchise, Huizenga purchased 15% of the National Football League's Miami Dolphins and its stadium in Miami Gardens, Florida. Founding owner Joe Robbie had recently died, and his surviving family found it difficult to keep the team afloat. In turn, Huizenga bought the remaining shares of the team for $115 million to obtain full ownership in 1994. He changed the name of Joe Robbie Stadium, selling the naming rights to Fruit of the Loom brand Pro Player for $2 million per year for 10 years. It has since been renamed many times – as Dolphins Stadium, Dolphin Stadium, Land Shark Stadium, Sun Life Stadium, as well as a few other corporate names, such as Fruit of the Loom, and Hard Rock Stadium.

In 2008, Huizenga sold 50% of the team and 50% of the stadium to Stephen M. Ross, chairman of The Related Companies. Huizenga remained the managing general partner of the franchise until January 2009, when he sold another 45% of the team and as much of the stadium to Ross. Thus, Ross became managing general partner with 95% ownership of the Dolphins and the stadium, and Huizenga retained a 5% share of both club and stadium. Huizenga remained the proprietor of 50% of the land.

In the early 1990s, Huizenga served a two-year probationary period with the National Football League as an owner, with the stipulation that he not buy another team.

Baseball
In the 1996 off-season period, and only four years after the Marlins' first expansion appearance in the Major League, Huizenga and General Manager Dave Dombrowski spent more than $89 million on free agents, the amount surprising the rest of the league. The Marlins strengthened its pitching staff by luring Alex Fernandez to Miami and brought over third baseman Bobby Bonilla, outfielder Moisés Alou, reliever Dennis Cook and outfielders John Cangelosi and Jim Eisenreich. In the 1997 season, the team made the playoffs for the first time in its history and went on to win the World Series, defeating the Cleveland Indians in seven games.

In the next off season, Huizenga, claiming a financial loss of approx. $34 million running the team that year, a claim subsequently disputed by Smith College economist Andrew Zimbalist in an essay, ordered the $54 million players-payroll to be cut, which led to an exodus of most of the Marlin's championship players. In November 1998, the year after it won the World Series, the Marlins were sold for a reported amount of approx. $150 million to commodities trader John Henry, who would go on to sell the franchise in order to finance his 2002 acquisition of the Boston Red Sox. In 2017, the Marlins was sold by owner Jeffrey Loria to a group of investors for a reported sum of $1.2 billion.

While his sale of the Marlins was characterized as "one of the worst moves in the franchise's history" and Huizenga subsequently expressed regret over his final years with the club and wished he had instead chosen to "go one more year", the analysts of the Baseball Prospectus, through statistical work, claimed that by both winning the sport's ultimate trophy and selling the club immediately after that win for a substantial profit, Wayne Huizenga proved to be a "genius."

When he sold the Marlins, Huizenga, who still owned then-Pro Player Stadium, retained the rights to skybox tickets and club seat customers, as well as 62.5% of parking revenue, and 30% of concessions. Economist Andrew Zimbalist commented that "Huizenga made a killing when he sold the team for $150 million [in 1998] and had the lease for this stadium that enabled him to keep just about all the stadium revenue."

Ice hockey
Huizenga operated the Florida Panthers as a public holding company, buying numerous real estate properties in the name of his Panthers Holding Group. Capitalizing on the team's 1996 drive to the Stanley Cup finals, he sold shares to the public, whose enthusiasm for the club drove civic leaders in Broward County to use public money to build a new arena for the team. Huizenga used the hockey team's stock as currency to begin building yet another diversified enterprise, buying two resort hotels owned partly by Huizenga and other Panthers officials. His original investment in the Panthers had nearly tripled in total value to $150 million.

In 2001, he sold the Panthers to pharmaceutical businessman and friend Alan Cohen and Cohen's partner, former NFL quarterback Bernie Kosar, for approximately $100 million. In December 2017, 25 years after he created the club, the Panthers retired the no. 37 shirt in honor of Huizenga. His family chose the number because it was his "birth year and lucky number."

Philanthropy
Huizenga funded the H. Wayne Huizenga School of Business and Entrepreneurship at the Nova Southeastern University in Fort Lauderdale, Florida. He donated to Pine Crest School, a private preparatory school, which named its science building Huizenga Science Building. He was a board member of the Laureus Foundation, a charity that, according to its mission statement, "us[es] the power of sport to end violence, discrimination and disadvantage." In 2009, his Huizenga Family Foundation donated the chapel at the South Florida Council's Scout camp in Davie, Florida.

Honors
In 1991, Huizenga received the Golden Plate Award of the American Academy of Achievement.

In 1992, Huizenga was named a "Distinguished American" by the Horatio Alger Association in 1992 for his funding of scholarships throughout Florida. He was named its 2008 Norman Vincent Peale Award recipient. His donations help fund the association's annual National Scholar awards.

Huizenga was named the 2005 Ernst & Young World Entrepreneur Of The Year.

In 2012, the City of Fort Lauderdale, Florida, renamed Southeast 9th Street in the Rio Vista neighborhood Wayne Huizenga Blvd.

Personal life and death
On September 10, 1960, he married Joyce Vander Wagen whom he met while in high school. He had known Joyce since his early school years in Evergreen Park. Wayne and Joyce had two children, Wayne Jr. and Scott. The marriage ended in divorce in 1966. Huizenga married his second wife, Martha Jean "Marti" (née Pike) Goldsby, a native of San Antonio, Florida, in April 1972. She was a secretary, who had done billing and clerical work in one of his businesses. He later adopted her son, Robert Ray, and daughter Pamela. The couple remained married until her death on January 3, 2017, following a fourteen-year battle with cancer.

In 2004, Huizenga purchased a private luxury yacht from the Australian professional golfer Greg Norman. The yacht cost $77 million and was further modified by Huizenga to feature a helipad for a 12-seat helicopter. In August 2004, Power & Motoryacht ranked it as the 43rd-longest yacht in the world.

In the 1980s, he began acquiring some 2,000 acres about 30 miles north of West Palm Beach. In 1996, he based the Floridian Golf & Yacht Club there, an exclusive golf club "with enough estate homes on the property to cover his costs," whose course was designed by Gary Player, where he extended free privileges to some two hundred "friends, relatives, and business associates," including actors Michael Douglas and Catherine Zeta-Jones and retired GE Chairman Jack Welch. He renamed his yacht Floridian, before selling the Floridian club and estate to Texas entrepreneur Jim Crane in 2010.

Huizenga died of cancer at his home in Fort Lauderdale, Florida, on the night of March 22, 2018. He was 80.

References

1937 births
2018 deaths
American billionaires
American people of Dutch descent
Calvin University alumni
Businesspeople from Illinois
Florida Panthers owners
Major League Baseball owners
Miami Dolphins owners
Miami Marlins owners
Military personnel from Illinois
National Hockey League executives
National Hockey League owners
Nova Southeastern University people
People from Evergreen Park, Illinois
Businesspeople from Fort Lauderdale, Florida
Deaths from cancer in Florida
20th-century American businesspeople
Pine Crest School alumni